Year 1197 (MCXCVII) was a common year starting on Wednesday (link will display the full calendar) of the Julian calendar.

Events 
 By place 

 Europe 
 Spring – Emperor Henry VI travels to Italy to persuade Pope Celestine III to crown his infant son Frederick II, who has been elected "King of the Romans" at Frankfurt.
 King Richard I (the Lionheart) has Château Gaillard (Normandy) built on the Seine River as he fights to restore Angevin power in northern France (approximate date).
 Summer – Henry VI takes cruel measures to put down an insurrection in Sicily and southern Italy, which has been provoked by the oppression of his German officials.
 September 28 – Henry VI dies of malaria at Messina (also possibly poisoned), while preparing an expedition against the Byzantine usurper Alexios III (Angelos).  
 Autumn – A German civil war begins upon the sudden death of Henry VI. Henry's brother, Philip of Swabia, takes over the family lands and claims his inheritance.
 Autumn – A dynastic feud breaks out between Emeric, King of Hungary and his younger brother Duke Andrew. After a brief skirmish, Emeric is forced to cede Croatia and Dalmatia to Andrew, who begins to administer the provinces as a de facto sovereign monarch.
 Winter – Duke Ottokar I forces his brother, Vladislaus III, to abandon Bohemia. Ottokar restores power and Vladislaus accepts the margravial title of Moravia.
 Saracen pirates, from the Balearic Islands, raid the city of Toulon in Provence, and the Benedictine monastery of Saint Honorat, on the Lérins Islands.
 Northern Crusades: Danish forces led by King Canute VI raid the area of present-day Estonia.

 Wales 
 April 28 – Rhys ap Gruffydd, a Welsh prince, dies and is succeeded by his eldest son Gruffydd ap Rhys II. With the help of Gwenwynwyn, his brother Maelgwn ap Rhys invades southern Wales.
 Summer – Gruffydd ap Rhys II is captured and handed over to Gwenwynwyn, who transfers him to the English. Gruffydd is imprisoned at Corfe Castle and Maelgwn ap Rhys claims the throne.

 Levant 
 September 10 – Henry I (or Henry II), king of Jerusalem, dies from falling out a first-floor window at his palace in Acre. His widow, Isabella I, becomes regent while the kingdom is thrown into consternation.
 September 22 – About 16,000 German crusaders reach Acre, starting the crusade of 1197. Emperor Henry VI, who planned to join the forces later on, was forced to stay behind in Sicily due to illness. On September 28 he dies at Messina. Meanwhile the crusaders manage to reconquer Sidon and Beirut but return to Germany after receiving the news of the emperor's death.

 Asia 
 Genghis Khan (or Temüjin), with help from the Keraites, defeats the Jurchens of the Jin Dynasty. The Jin bestowed Genghis' blood brother Toghrul with the honorable title of Ong Khan, and Genghis receives the lesser title of j'aut quri. During the winter, Toghrul returns and re-establishes himself as leader of the Keraites.

 By topic 

 Religion 
 Arbroath Abbey located in the Scottish town of Arbroath, is consecrated and dedicated to St. Thomas Becket.

Births 
 October 22 – Juntoku, emperor of Japan (d. 1242)
 Amadeus IV, count of Savoy (House of Savoy) (d. 1253)
 Dharmasvamin, Tibetan monk and pilgrim (d. 1264)
 Ibn al-Baitar, Moorish botanist and pharmacist (d. 1248)
 John de Braose (Tadody), English nobleman (or 1198)
 Naratheinga Uzana, Burmese prince and regent (d. 1235)
 Nicola Paglia, Italian priest and preacher (d. 1256)
 Nikephoros Blemmydes, Byzantine theologian (d. 1272)
 Oberto Pallavicino, Italian nobleman (signore) (d. 1269)
 Raymond VII, French nobleman and knight (d. 1249)
 Richard of Chichester, bishop of Chichester (d. 1253) 
 William de Braose, English nobleman (d. 1230)

Deaths 
 April 23 – Davyd Rostislavich, Kievan Grand Prince (b. 1140)
 April 28 – Rhys ap Gruffydd, Welsh prince of Deheubarth 
 June 1 – Gertrude of Bavaria, queen consort of Denmark
 July 9 – Rudolf of Wied (or Rudolph), archbishop of Trier
 September 10 – Henry I (or Henry II), king of Jerusalem (b. 1166)
 September 18 – Margaret of France, daughter of Louis VII 
 September 28 – Henry VI, Holy Roman Emperor (b. 1165)
 November 13 – Homobonus of Cremona, Italian merchant 
 December 12 – Wu (or Xiansheng), Chinese empress (b. 1115)
 Alix of France, French countess consort and regent (b. 1150)
 Bretislav III, bishop of Prague (House of Přemyslid) (b. 1137)
 Burhan al-Din al-Marghinani, Arab Hanafi jurist (b. 1135)
 Jamal al-Din al-Ghaznawi, Arab scholar and theologian
 Jón Loftsson, Icelandic chieftain and politician (b. 1124)
 Jordan Lupin, Italo-Norman nobleman and rebel leader
 Margaritus of Brindisi, Sicilian Grand Admiral (b. 1149)
 Owain ap Gruffydd (or Cyfeiliog), Welsh prince (b. 1130)
 Peter II (or Theodor-Peter), ruler (tsar) of the Bulgaria 
 Peter Cantor (the Chanter), French theologian and writer
 Ruadhri Ua Flaithbertaigh, Irish king of Iar Connacht
 Tughtakin ibn Ayyub, Ayyubid emir (prince) of Arabia
 Walter Devereux, Norman nobleman and knight (b. 1173)
 William de Longchamp, Norman nobleman and bishop

References